Adam Bogdan Fedoruk (born 11 December 1966) is a Polish football manager and former player, currently in charge of Polish club Granica Kętrzyn.

Career
Fedoruk played club football for Olimpia Elbląg, Stal Mielec, Legia Warsaw, Amica Wronki, Raków Częstochowa, AO Kavala, Zatoka Braniewo, Lechia Gdańsk and the Pittsburgh Riverhounds. Between 1990 and 1994, Fedoruk made 18 international appearances for Poland, scoring one goal.

References

External links
 
 

1966 births
Living people
Polish footballers
Poland international footballers
Stal Mielec players
Pittsburgh Riverhounds SC players
People from Elbląg
Lechia Gdańsk players
Amica Wronki players
Legia Warsaw players
Kavala F.C. players
Sportspeople from Warmian-Masurian Voivodeship
Association football midfielders
Super League Greece players
Polish expatriate footballers
Expatriate footballers in Greece
Polish expatriate sportspeople in Greece
Expatriate soccer players in the United States
Polish expatriate sportspeople in the United States
Polish football managers
Olimpia Elbląg managers
Karpaty Krosno managers
Wigry Suwałki managers
I liga managers